P. sativa may refer to:
 Pastinaca sativa, the parsnip, a root vegetable species related to the carrot
 Pinus sativa, a synonym for Pinus pinea, the stone pine, a tree species

See also
 Sativa